Grenville House is a mid-rise (14 floors) apartment complex at 1-3 Magazine Gap Road in the Mid-levels area of Hong Kong Island, Hong Kong and completed in 1971.

From 1997 to 2006 a four bedroom unit belonging to Tung Chee-hwa served as the official residence of the Chief Executive of Hong Kong and thus left Government House, Hong Kong vacant. Tung choose to live at Grenville House as he was comfortable remaining at his then current home and believed the bad Feng Shui at Government House.

See also

There is also an identically named Outdoor Education Center, Grenville House, in Brixham, UK.

References

Mid-Levels
Official residences in Hong Kong